This is a list of beaches in Montenegro.

 Ada Bojana, Ulcinj
 Bečići, Budva
 Buljarica, Budva
 Crvena Plaža, Bar
 Drobni Pijesak, Budva
 Gradska Plaža, Bar
 Jaz Beach, Budva
 Kamenovo, Budva
 Kraljičina Plaža, Budva
 Ladies Beach
 Liman, Ulcinj
 Liman II, Ulcinj
 Mala Plaža, Ulcinj
 Mendra, Ulcinj
 Miločer, Budva
 Mogren, Budva
 Petrovac
 Ploče, Budva
 Ponta Nuradinit, Ulcinj
 Pržno, Budva
 Slovenska Plaza, Budva
 Sutomore, Bar
 Sveti Stefan, Budva
 Trsteno, Budva
 Valdanos, Ulcin]
 Velika Plaža, Ulcinj
 Žukotrlica, Bar

Ulcinj
This is a list of beaches in Ulcinj.
Key:
  – Indicates a Blue Flag beach
  – Indicates a camping area

Kruče
Valdanos
Opaljika
Mendra
Liman II
Liman I
Italijanska Beach
Nuradinova Ponta
Mala Plaža
Beach "Aquarius"
Beach "Ibiza"
Beach "Sapore di Mare"
Ladies Beach
 Beach "Albatros"
Velika Plaža
 Beach "Miami" 
 Beach "Copacabana"
 Beach "Evropa"
 Beach "MCM"
 Beach "Safari"  
 Beach "Tropicana"  
Beach "Saranda"
Beach "Tampico"
Beach "Adriatica"
Beach "Toni Grill"
Beach "Mojito"
Beach "White"
Beach "Lux"
Beach "Coco"
Beach "Kite Surf Dulcigno"
Ada Bojana

See also

 List of beaches

References 

 
Tourism in Montenegro
Atlantic Ocean-related lists